Rohlig may refer to:

Harald Rohlig (1926–2014), German musician
Röhlig Logistics, a German international logistic company